Gift Showemimo (born 24 May 1974) is a Nigerian footballer who played as a forward for the Nigeria women's national football team. She was part of the team at the 1991 FIFA Women's World Cup. At the club level, she played for Kakanfo Babes in Nigeria.

References

External links
 

1974 births
Living people
Nigerian women's footballers
Nigeria women's international footballers
Place of birth missing (living people)
1991 FIFA Women's World Cup players
Women's association football forwards
Yoruba sportswomen
 Yoruba people